Mitchell Owen Van Dyk (born June 18, 1991) is a former American football offensive tackle and guard. He played college football at Portland State University for the Portland State Vikings, and was drafted by the St. Louis Rams in the seventh round (226 pick) of the 2014 NFL draft. Van Dyk has also been a member of the Pittsburgh Steelers, Indianapolis Colts, San Francisco 49ers, Calgary Stampeders and BC Lions.

College career
Mitchell Van Dyk attended Portland State University. Van Dyk played in a total of 36 games and started 33 of them.

Professional career

St. Louis Rams
Van Dyk was drafted by the St. Louis Rams in the seventh round of the 2014 NFL Draft. He was released by the Rams on August 30, 2014.

Pittsburgh Steelers
Van Dyk signed a reserve/future contract with the Pittsburgh Steelers on January 15, 2015. Van Dyk spent the entire 2015 season on the Pittsburgh Steelers' injured reserve list after being waived-injured by the team on September 5, 2015.

Indianapolis Colts
On April 20, 2016, Van Dyk signed with the Indianapolis Colts. He was waived on May 2. On June 6, 2016, Van Dyk was re-signed to the Colts roster. On September 3, 2016, he was waived by the Colts as part of final roster cuts.

San Francisco 49ers
On December 13, 2016, Van Dyk was signed to the 49ers' practice squad.

He participated in The Spring League in 2017.

References

External links
 Profile at GoViks.com

1990 births
Living people
Players of American football from California
American football offensive tackles
Portland State Vikings football players
St. Louis Rams players
Pittsburgh Steelers players
Indianapolis Colts players
San Francisco 49ers players
People from Paso Robles, California
The Spring League players